Mozahar Ali Prodhan (31 March 1952-5 January 2018) was a Bangladesh Nationalist Party politician and a Jatiya Sangsad member from the Joypurhat-1 constituency.

Career
Prodhan was elected to parliament from Joypurhat-1 in 2008 as a Bangladesh Nationalist Party Candidate. He also served as the president of Joypurhat District unit of Bangladesh Nationalist Party. On 8 October 2010, a legal notice to terminated his membership in parliament was filed on the basis that he gave false information to the election commission.

Death
Prodhan died on 5 January 2018.

References

2018 deaths
Bangladesh Nationalist Party politicians
9th Jatiya Sangsad members
1952 births
People from Joypurhat District